The 1941 New Hampshire Wildcats football team was an American football team that represented the University of New Hampshire as a member of the New England Conference during the 1941 college football season. In its fifth year under head coach George Sauer, the team compiled a 4–3–1 record, outscoring their opponents 153–62. The team played its home games at Lewis Field (also known as Lewis Stadium) in Durham, New Hampshire.

Due to World War II, the next time the Wildcats would play an eight-game season would be 1946.

Schedule

The 1941 game remains the last time that the Bates and New Hampshire football programs have met.

Notes

References

New Hampshire
New Hampshire Wildcats football seasons
New Hampshire Wildcats football